Parole Chicago was a German television series directed by Reinhard Schwabenitzky, starring Christoph Waltz as Eduard "Ede" Bredo, an inept wannabe criminal in 1920s Berlin. Its entire run of 13 episodes first aired in 1979. The show was loosely based on Henry Slesar's Ruby Martinson series of short stories, written from 1957 to 1962.

See also
List of German television series

References

External links
 

Television shows set in Berlin
Television series set in the 1920s
1979 German television series debuts
1979 German television series endings
German comedy television series
German crime television series
Television shows based on short fiction
German-language television shows
Das Erste original programming